Joshua Walter McGeough Bond (1831 – 29 August 1905) was an Irish Conservative Party politician.

Bond was elected Conservative Member of Parliament (MP) for Armagh City at a by-election in 1855—caused by the death of Ross Stephenson Moore—but was then defeated by Stearne Miller at the next election. Although he regained the seat in 1859, he only held it for one term before retiring from the race in 1865.

References

External links
 

1831 births
1905 deaths
Irish Conservative Party MPs
Members of the Parliament of the United Kingdom for County Armagh constituencies (1801–1922)
UK MPs 1852–1857
UK MPs 1859–1865